The women's 100 metres event at the 1955 Pan American Games was held at the Estadio Universitario in Mexico City on 15 and 16 March.

Medalists

Results

Heats

Final

References

Athletics at the 1955 Pan American Games
1955